The Twenty-eighth Amendment of the Constitution Bill 2008 (bill no. 14 of 2008) was a proposed amendment to the Constitution of Ireland that was put to a referendum in 2008 (the first Lisbon referendum). The purpose of the proposed amendment was to allow the state to ratify the Treaty of Lisbon of the European Union.

The amendment was rejected by voters on 12 June 2008 by a margin of 53.4% to 46.6%, with a turnout of 53.1%. The treaty had been intended to enter into force on 1 January 2009, but had to be delayed following the Irish rejection. However, the Lisbon treaty was approved by Irish voters when the Twenty-eighth Amendment of the constitution was approved in the second Lisbon referendum, held in October 2009.

Background

The Treaty of Lisbon was signed by the member states of the European Union on 13 December 2007. It was in large part of a revision of the text of the Treaty establishing a Constitution for Europe after its rejection in referendums in France in May 2005 and in the Netherlands in June 2005. The Treaty of Lisbon preserved most of the content of the Constitution, especially the new rules on the functioning of the European Institutions, but gives up any symbolic or terminologic reference to a Constitution. (See Treaty of Lisbon compared to the European Constitution.)

Because of the decision of the Supreme Court in Crotty v. An Taoiseach (1987), an amendment to the Constitution was required before it could be ratified by Ireland. Ireland was the only one of the then 15 EU member states to put the Treaty to the people in a referendum. Ratification of the Treaty in all other member states was decided upon by national parliaments alone.

Proposed changes to the text
The Twenty-eighth Amendment of the Constitution Bill proposed to make the following changes to Article 29.4:

Deletion of subsections 9º and 11:

Subsection 10º renumbered as subsection 9º.

Insertion of the following subsections:

Oireachtas debate
On 26 February 2008, the Government of Ireland approved the text of the changes to the constitution. The Twenty-eighth Amendment of the Constitution Bill was proposed in Dáil Éireann by Minister for Foreign Affairs Dermot Ahern on 2 April 2008. It passed final stages in the Dáil on 29 April, with Sinn Féin TDs and Independent TD Tony Gregory rising against, but with insufficient numbers to call a vote. It passed final stages in the Seanad on 7 May.

Campaign

A Referendum Commission was established by Minister for the Environment, Heritage and Local Government John Gormley. It was chaired by former High Court judge Iarfhlaith O'Neill. Its role was to prepare one or more statements containing a general explanation of the subject matter of the proposal and of the text of the proposal in the amendment bill.

Participants
Participants were:

Events
The government parties of Fianna Fáil and the Progressive Democrats were in favour of the treaty, but the other government party, the Green Party, was divided on the issue. At a special convention on 19 January 2008, the leadership of the Green Party failed to secure a two-thirds majority required to make support for the referendum official party policy. The result of the vote was 63% in favour. As a result, the Green Party itself did not participate in the referendum debate, although individual members were free to be involved in whatever side they chose; all Green Party members of the Oireachtas supported the Treaty. The main opposition parties of Fine Gael and the Labour Party were also in favour. Only one party represented in the Oireachtas, Sinn Féin, was opposed to the treaty, while minor parties opposed to it included the Socialist Party, the Workers' Party and the Socialist Workers Party. Independent TD's Tony Gregory and Finian McGrath, Independent MEP Kathy Sinnott, and Independent members of the Seanad from the universities David Norris, Shane Ross and Rónán Mullen advocated a No vote as well.

The then Taoiseach Bertie Ahern warned against making Ireland a 'battlefield' for eurosceptics across Europe. The invitation by UCD's Law Society to French far-right politician Jean-Marie Le Pen was seen as an example of this. Nigel Farage, leader of the United Kingdom Independence Party, committed his party to supporting the No campaign saying: “UKIP members will be encouraged to go to Ireland to help.”

The Government sent bilingual booklets written in English and Irish, explaining the Treaty, to all 2.5 million Irish households. However compendiums of the two previous treaties, of which the Lisbon Treaty is intended to be a series of reforms and amendments, remain unavailable in Ireland. Some commentators have argued that the treaty remains essentially incomprehensible in the absence of such a compendium.

On 12 March 2008, Libertas, a lobby group started by businessman Declan Ganley launched a campaign called Facts, not politics which advocated a No vote in the referendum. A month later, the German Chancellor, Angela Merkel appealed to Irish people to vote Yes in the referendum whilst on a visit to Ireland. The anti-Lisbon Treaty campaign group accused the government and Fine Gael of a U-turn on their previous policy of discouraging foreign leaders from visiting Ireland during the referendum campaign. The European Commissioner for the Internal Market Charlie McCreevy admitted he had not read the Treaty from cover to cover, and said "he would not expect any sane person to do so".

At the start of May, the Irish Alliance for Europe launched its campaign for a Yes vote in the referendum this consisted of trade unionists, business people, academics and politicians. Its members include Garret FitzGerald, Ruairi Quinn, Pat Cox and Michael O'Kennedy. The Taoiseach Brian Cowen stated that should any member of the Fianna Fáil parliamentary party campaign against the treaty, they would likely be expelled from the party.

On 21 May 2008, the executive council of the Irish Congress of Trade Unions voted to support a Yes vote in the referendum. Rank and file members of the individual unions were not balloted and the Technical, Engineering and Electrical Union (TEEU) advised its 45,000 members to vote No. The Irish bishops conference stated the Catholic Church's declaration that the treaty would not weaken Ireland's constitutional ban on abortion, however the conference did not advocate either a Yes or No vote. By the start of June, Fianna Fáil, Fine Gael and the Labour Party had united in their push for a Yes vote despite earlier divisions. The two largest farming organisations, the Irish Creamery Milk Suppliers Association (ICMSA) and the Irish Farmers' Association called for a Yes vote, the latter giving its support after assurances from the Taoiseach Brian Cowen that Ireland would use its veto in Europe if a deal on World Trade reform was unacceptable.

Opinion polls

Voting
There were 3,051,278 voters on the electoral register. The vast majority of voting took place on Thursday, 12 June between 07:00 and 22:00. Counting began the following morning at 09:00. Several groups voted before the standard polling day:

Some groups were able to cast postal votes before 9 June, namely: members of the Irish Defence Forces serving in United Nations peacekeeping missions; Irish diplomats and their spouses abroad; members of the Garda Síochána; those unable to vote in person due to physical illness or disability; those who would be unable to vote in person due to their employment (including students); and prisoners.

On 9 June, several islands off the coast of County Donegal voted: Tory Island, Inisfree, Gola, Inishbofin and Arranmore Island; these islands are all part of the Donegal South-West constituency. Around 37% of the 745 eligible voted. Two days later, several islands off the coast of Counties Galway and Mayo voted: the Aran Islands (Inis Mór, Inis Meáin and Inis Oírr) and Inishboffin form part of Galway West constituency; while Inishturk, Inishbiggle and Clare Island form part of the Mayo constituency. The Galway islands had 1,169 eligible to vote, while the Mayo islands had 197.

Result
Votes were counted separately in each Dáil constituency. The overall verdict was formally announced by the Referendum Returning officer in Dublin Castle by accumulating the constituency totals.

The national result was as follows:

Reasons for rejection
Ireland had begun to cast a sceptical eye on the EU and general concerns about how Europe was developing were raised. In Spring 2007, the Irish citizenry had the second least European identity in the EU, with 59% identifying as exclusively Irish as opposed to wholly/partly European. The integrationist aspects of the Lisbon treaty were therefore also of concern. Few expressed specifically anti-EU statements, but pro-EU sentiments were interpreted or expressed in favour of an idealised/desired EU and expressed concern about its present form or the future direction of the EU post-Lisbon. To keep Ireland's power and identity, voters chose to vote "no".

Another factor in Lisbon's failure was Lisbon itself. An impenetrable legal document, it could not be understood without close study, and even the Referendum Commission – the nonpartisan body set up to explain it – could not explain it all. The treaty's lack of clarity meant that interpretations could not be confidently stated to be true or false. Consequently, issues such as
abortion,

tax,
euthanasia,
the veto,
EU directives,
qualified majority voting,
Ireland's commissioner,
detention of three-year-olds,
the death penalty,
Euroarmy conscription,
gay marriage,
immigration,
nuclear energy, workers' rights, sovereignty,
and neutrality
were raised, some of which were spurious or actually dealt with by the Treaty of Nice. The "No" faction could fight on whichever terrain they wished and could give positive reasons for rejecting the treaty, such as the possibility of renegotiation. Conversely, the "Yes" faction could only offer negatives and could only react to the statements of the other side. Lacking a clear identification of specifics, voters chose to vote "No".

In September 2008 rumours in Brussels indicated that US billionaires and neocons heavily influenced the Irish vote by sponsoring the "No" campaigns, particularly those of Declan Ganley's Libertas lobby group. It is said that US interest groups this way pursued their goal of hindering the European Union to become a stronger partner internationally. However, the British conservative MEP Jonathan Evans reported to EUobserver on 9 December 2008 after returning from a European Parliament delegation to the US, "[o]ur congressional colleagues drew our attention to a statement from US deputy secretary of state John Negroponte at Trinity College Dublin on 17 November, completely refuting the suggestion of any US dimension whatsoever". The European Parliament is considering launching "an inquiry to discover whether US agencies actively supported Libertas in the 12 June referendum."

A poll was published by the Irish Times on 18 June 2008. The question was "Why did you vote no?" and the results are given below.

A Flash Eurobarometer poll of 2,000 random respondents was conducted between 13 and 15 June on behalf of the European Commission by Gallup. Those respondents who voted "no" in the referendum were asked "Please tell me what are the reasons why you voted "no" to the treaty?" and the results are given below.

French Europe Minister Jean-Pierre Jouyet blamed "American neoconservatives" for the Irish voter's rejection of the treaty.

Second referendum

In the meeting of the European Council (the meeting of the heads of government of all twenty-seven European Union member states) in Brussels on 11–12 December 2008, Taoiseach Brian Cowen presented the concerns of the Irish people relating to taxation policy, family, social and ethical issues, and Ireland's policy of neutrality. Effectively Ireland's position was renegotiated, and the revised package was approved by the electorate in 2009. Because of the Irish financial crisis it was also apparent that Ireland would need increased financial support from the European Union.

The European Council agreed that: 
the necessary legal guarantees would be given that nothing in the Treaty of Lisbon made any change of any kind to the Union's competences on taxation for any member state; 
the necessary legal guarantees would be given that the Treaty of Lisbon did not prejudice the security and defence policy of any member state, including Ireland's traditional policy of neutrality; 
the necessary legal guarantees would be given that neither the Treaty of Lisbon (including the Justice and Home Affairs provisions), nor the EU Charter of Fundamental Rights, affected the provisions of the Irish Constitution in relation to the right to life, education and the family in any way; 
in accordance with the necessary legal procedures, a Decision would be taken to retain Ireland's Commissioner, provided that the Treaty of Lisbon was ratified; 
the high importance attached to issues including workers' rights would be confirmed.

The Irish Government then committed to seeking ratification of the Treaty of Lisbon by the end of the term of the current European Commission (October 2009), provided that the above were implemented satisfactorily.

The European Council did not specify what forms the legal guarantees would take. The Sunday Business Post stated that what the European Council had offered were Decisions and/or Declarations, not protocols. Decisions and/or Declarations of the European Council are agreements made between all twenty-seven member states of the European Union and are not part of a treaty, whereas protocols are agreements between states as part of a treaty. Previous examples of Decisions and/or Declarations following a referendum rejection include the 1992 Edinburgh Agreement (following the first Danish referendum on the Maastricht Treaty) and the 2002 Seville Declarations on the Treaty of Nice (following the first Irish referendum on the Treaty of Nice). French President Nicolas Sarkozy, speaking to the European Parliament in his capacity as President of the European Council during the six-month presidency of that body by France, stated that the legal guarantees would be added as a protocol later to the treaty, enabling Croatia to join the European Union legally.

The guarantee that Ireland would keep its Commissioner provided Lisbon was ratified was criticised in the Irish Times on the grounds that it may lead to an oversized European Commission.

The Twenty-eighth Amendment in October 2009 formally authorised the government to ratify the Treaty of Lisbon.

See also
European Commission Representation in Ireland
Politics of the Republic of Ireland

References

External links

Official websites
Oireachtas Debates: Twenty-eighth Amendment of the Constitution Bill 2008
The Lisbon Treaty – Referendum Commission
Reform Treaty – An explanatory guide – Government of Ireland
Reform Treaty – Department of Foreign Affairs
Official Treaty website – Europa
Treaty of Lisbon text
Treaty of Lisbon (EU Reform Treaty) – National Forum on Europe
Full text of the Constitution of Ireland

Unofficial consolidated treaties
Treaty of Lisbon 2007: Consolidated Treaties – Institute of European Affairs

Media overviews
Lisbon Treaty – RTÉ
The Lisbon Treaty – The Irish Times
Photos & Recordings of the College Historical Society debate on the Irish ratification of the Lisbon Treaty, featuring Garret FitzGerald, Joe Higgins, Declan Ganley and Maurice Hayes.

Political party campaigns
Vote 4 Europe – Fianna Fáil
Heart of Europe – Fine Gael
EU Reform Treaty – Green Party
YES to the Lisbon Reform Treaty...for a better Europe – Labour Party
No 2 Lisbon Treaty Website – Sinn Féin
No to Lisbon – éirígí
Lisbon – A Treaty Too Far – Workers' Party

Groups
Campaign Against the EU Constitution
Cóir – Lisbon Treaty No Campaign
Yes to Lisbon – Irish Alliance for Europe
No to Lisbon campaign – Libertas
Vote No to Lisbon Treaty – People Before Profit
Peoples' Movement
VoteNo.ie
Vote No – Workers Solidarity Movement

Articles
A "no" vote in Ireland would be disastrous for Europe. Spotlight Europe, Bertelsmann Stiftung, 15 May 2008.

2008 elections in Europe
2008 in international relations
2008 in Irish law
2008 in Irish politics
2008 referendums
2008 in the Republic of Ireland
Euroscepticism in Ireland
28
28
Ireland, 28
Treaty of Lisbon
June 2008 events in Europe
Amendment, 28, 2008

es:Referéndum sobre el Tratado de Lisboa en Irlanda